WQAZ-LP is a Variety formatted broadcast radio station licensed to Edmond, West Virginia and serving Central Fayette County, West Virginia.  WQAZ-LP is owned and operated by The Syner Foundation.

Fined
On February 26, 2015, The Syner Foundation, owner of WQAZ-LP, was fined $16,000 by the Federal Communications Commission (FCC) for "broadcast[ing] announcements that promoted the products, services or businesses of its financial contributors."

References

External links
 

2005 establishments in West Virginia
Variety radio stations in the United States
Radio stations established in 2005
QAZ-LP
QAZ-LP